Travis Meadows (born 1965) is an American country music singer and songwriter. He has released four albums and written a number of songs for other country artists.

Early life
Meadows was born in 1965 in Mississippi, growing up in Jackson. He began using drugs at an early age, and at 14 was diagnosed with bone cancer, which led to the loss of most of his right leg.

Music career
At the age of 16, he began playing in local bands, starting his musical career as a drummer before beginning to play the harmonica and guitar by the time he was 21. During his early 20s, he performed with blues musicians such as Sam Myers, and moved to Gatlinburg, where he began writing songs. In his mid-20s, Meadows became a Christian missionary and later a preacher, traveling around the United States and overseas, as well as writing and performing Christian music. By his late 30s, however, he had become disenchanted with the church, and moved to Nashville to pursue a songwriting career. He signed a contract with Universal Music Publishing, releasing his debut album My life 101 I'm 2007, but at the same time his life-long drinking and drug habits led to a multi-year descent into alcoholism and abuse. After four trips to rehab, he succeeded in regaining sobriety in 2010.

In 2011, Meadows released his second studio album, Killin' uncle Buzzy, written while in rehab in 2010. According to Meadows, a counselor had suggested keeping a journal, which led to him writing songs instead. In 2013, after his songwriting contract with Universal expired, he began writing independently before signing with independent record label Kobalt Music and releasing a third album, Old Ghosts & Unfinished Business.

In 2017, Meadows released his fourth album, First Cigarette. The album was produced by Jeremy Spillman and assisted by Jay Joyce, and is the first album by Meadows to receive label support. It is also his first album to appear on Billboard charts, reaching No. 21 on Heatseekers Albums and No. 48 on Independent Albums. It sold 1,100 copies in its debut week, reaching No. 17 on Americana/Folk Album Sales and No. 34 on Country Album Sales.

On April 30, 2021, Earache Records reissued Killin' uncle Buzzy for the record's 10th Anniversary, including a limited edition clear vinyl. This was the first time the album had been available on vinyl and released by a label.

Television appearances 
In 2016, Travis Meadows was featured in an episode of the television show American Elements.

Discography

Albums/EPs

Songs Recorded by Other Artists 

In addition to his solo work, Meadows has written songs for other country musicians.

References

1965 births
Living people
American country singer-songwriters
Country musicians from Mississippi
Singer-songwriters from Mississippi
People from Sevier County, Tennessee
Musicians from Jackson, Mississippi
Country musicians from Tennessee
American male singer-songwriters
Singer-songwriters from Tennessee